The Politics of Shenzhen in Guangdong province in the People's Republic of China is structured in a dual party-government system like all other governing institutions in mainland China.

The Mayor of Shenzhen is the highest-ranking official in the People's Government of Shenzhen or Shenzhen Municipal Government. However, in the city's dual party-government governing system, the Mayor has less power than Chinese Communist Party Committee Secretary of Shenzhen, colloquially termed the "CCP Party Chief of Shenzhen" or "Communist Party Secretary of Shenzhen".

List of mayors of Shenzhen

After Shenzhen was designated as a Special Economic Zone

List of CCP Party secretaries of Shenzhen

After Shenzhen was designated as a Special Economic Zone

Laws
The city government introduced a good samaritan law in 2013, which intends to protect potential good samaritans from being scammed by people pretending to be victims. This was the first such law passed by a municipal government in Mainland China. In 2020 the city passed the "Shenzhen Special Economic Zone Regulations on the Comprehensive Ban on Wild Animals", effective May 1 of that year, which also banned eating cats, dogs, and several other species, also making it the first in Mainland China.

Paid leave became legally required in November 2020.

References

External links
 List of Mayors and Communist Party Secretaries of Shenzhen on People.com.cn (25 August 2005)  
 List of Mayors and Communist Party Secretaries of Shenzhen on People.com.cn (27 March 2015)  

Shenzhen
Shenzhen